Lieutenant General Brian Ashley "Ash" Power  (born 20 January 1957) is a retired senior officer of the Australian Army. Power served as Chief of Joint Operations from 2011 until his retirement in May 2014.

Military career
Power entered the Royal Military College, Duntroon in January 1975. He graduated nearly four years later in December 1978 and was allocated to the Royal Australian Artillery. He was posted to the 4th Field Regiment for regimental duty and performed the functions of Section Commander, Gun Position Officer, and Assistant Adjutant. He later returned to command the Regiment, for which he was awarded the Conspicuous Service Cross in 1998.

He has been an instructor at the School of Artillery, the Royal Military College, Duntroon and the Royal Military Academy Sandhurst, Camberley, United Kingdom, and has also attended Command and Staff College, Bangkok, Thailand.

In November 1998 Power deployed to Bougainville Island on Operation Belisi as the Chief of Staff, and in September 1999 was deployed as the Colonel Operations for International Force East Timor (INTERFET). He was posted as the Defence Attaché Thailand in January 2000, and on his return in January 2002, studied at the Australian Centre for Defence and Strategic Studies, Canberra.

Power was promoted to brigadier on 22 November 2002, and assumed command of the 1st Brigade on 6 December 2002.

In 2005 Power was promoted to major general, and assumed command of the 1st Division on 2 July 2005.

In June 2006 he became a Member of the Order of Australia, and in November 2006 was posted as Commander Joint Task Force 636.

Power served as Australian Commander of Exercise Talisman Sabre 2007 (TS07) before assuming command of Training Command, Army on 6 July 2007.

In May 2011, Power was promoted to lieutenant general and appointed Chief of Joint Operations (CJOPS) and Commander of Headquarters, Joint Operations Command (HQJOC). He was upgraded to an Officer of the Order of Australia in the 2012 Australia Day Honours List.

Ash Power is a veteran of Iraq, Afghanistan, East Timor and Bougainville.

Personal
In 1978, Power married Narelle. They have two daughters.

Honours and awards

References

External links

 Copyright photo of Major General Ash Power AM CSC, Commander 1st Division, 26 April 2007. Source:Kapyong Parade for 3rd Battalion
General John Abizaid (US Army), right, presents Major General Ash Power with The Legion of Merit award Photo by Phill Vavasour 

1957 births
Military personnel from Victoria (Australia)
Academics of the Royal Military Academy Sandhurst
Academics of the Staff College, Camberley
Australian generals
Australian military personnel of the International Force for East Timor
Australian military personnel of the Iraq War
Australian military personnel of the War in Afghanistan (2001–2021)
Chiefs of Joint Operations (Australia)
Living people
Officers of the Legion of Merit
Officers of the Order of Australia
People from Wangaratta
Recipients of the Conspicuous Service Cross (Australia)
Royal Military College, Duntroon graduates
Australian recipients of the Meritorious Service Medal (United States)